Mahamayuri (  ("great peacock"),  Kǒngquè Míngwáng,  Gongjak Myeongwang), or Mahāmāyūrī Vidyārājñī is a bodhisattva and female Wisdom King in Mahayana and Vajrayana Buddhism. In the latter tradition, Mahamayuri is a popular practice in both the Chinese and Japanese forms of Vajrayana. She is also the name of one of the five protective goddesses in Buddhism.

Name and origin
The Sanskrit name Mahāmāyūrī means 'great peahen'. Known as the 'Queen of the secret sciences' and the 'Godmother of Buddha', Mahamayuri is believed to have the power to protect devotees from poisoning, either physical or spiritual. In Buddhism, her demeanor is in contrast to the wrathful attitudes of male personifications of the Wisdom Kings.

The Mahamayuri text is a Buddhist dharani-genre text, containing magical incantations to treat snake bites, poisons and other maladies. Mahamayuri's dharani was translated into Chinese by Kumārajīva between 402 and 412 CE. It contains the only mention of the Rig Veda in the entire Chinese Buddhist canon.

Her origins are said to derive from an Indian goddess of the same name. She is one of the Nepali pañcarakṣā deities, where she is the chief of the five rakṣā (守護) in the five parasol configuration, occupying the northern position. Unlike her four companions of the pañcarakṣā she appears to have had a fairly well-developed cult in India.

Iconography

Despite being associated with the Wisdom Kings, Mahāmāyūrī tends to be portrayed with a benevolent expression rather than a wrathful one. She has three faces and six hands.

Her origins are said to derive from an Indian goddess of the same name. She is portrayed riding a top a peacock and commonly sporting four arms. Although the items she holds varies among traditions, common items include a citron, bael fruit, lotus flower and a peacock tail feather. With the moon as a backrest, wearing peaceful ornaments and garments. Seated in the half (vajrasana) posture.

Legends

According to legend, during the primordial times, the original Phoenix (Fenghuang), the leader of flying beings, gave birth to the peacock Mahamayuri and the eagle Golden Winged Great Peng. The peacock once consumed the Buddha, who however managed to escape via cutting her stomach. The Buddha intended to kill the peacock, however the deities told him to stop, thus the Buddha promoted her to be his godmother, therefore the eagle would be his uncle.

One of the Journey to the West records, during the youth of the king of the Kingdom of Zhuzi (then only a prince) had a hobby of hunting. One day, he accidentally killed two followers of Mahamayuri. Later on, Mahamayuri said that to pay for this, the prince will suffer a lovesick for 3 years. At the time, the bodhisattva Guanyin's steed Golden Haired Hou, went across the scene and managed to hear this. Years later, when the prince had grown up and became the king of the kingdom, the Golden Haired Hou took advantage of the child who guards him sleeping, escaped to the mortal realm, became the demon king Sai Tai Sui, and kidnapped the Lady of Jinsheng Palace (金聖宮娘娘), one of the king's favorite consorts, and forced her to marry him. Without the lady, the king got sick for three years.

In Chinese Buddhism 
In China, she is known as Kǒngquè Míngwáng (孔雀明王) and her image is enshrined in many Chinese Buddhist temples. In contemporary times, her veneration is thought to be closely related to medical care, public health, environmental protection, and social welfare.

In China, some of the temples which venerate her include the Luohan Temple in Chongqing, Wuyou Temple, Baoguang Temple and Fuhu Temple in Sichuan, Shifo Temple in Shaanxi, Jinguangming Temple in Fujian, as well as Qiongzhu Temple in Yunnan. In Taiwan, her veneration is promoted by the Chinese Great Peacock Buddha Association(中華世界大孔雀佛協會), which has their main headquarters located at Kaicheng Temple. In Singapore, one temple which venerates her is Hua Gim Si Temple.

In Japanese Buddhism
In Japan she was known as the name Kujaku Myōō (孔雀明王). There is a record stating that she was worshiped during the Nara period, and her image was placed at the newly constructed Saidai-ji Temple Kondo (Saidai-ji Temple Golden Hall).

Gallery

See also
 Chinese Buddhism
Chinese gods and immortals
 List of Japanese deities

Notes

External links
The Mahamayuri Vidyarajni Sutra  (Taisho Volume 19, Number 982) translated into English by Cheng Yew Chung based on Amoghavajra's Chinese translation
The Ritual Procedure for Constructing the Mandala of Mahamayuri Vidyarajni (Taisho Volume 19, Number 983) translated into English by Cheng Yew Chung based on Amoghavajra's Chinese translation

Buddhist deities
Bodhisattvas
Chinese gods
Wisdom Kings
Birds in religion
Peafowl